Steve Watson is the current director of athletics for Loyola University Chicago. He previously served as athletic director at St. Bonaventure University from 2006 to 2014, and as an associate athletic director at Eastern Michigan University from 2001 to 2006. Watson attended college at Rutgers University and Bowling Green State University, where he played on both school's college basketball teams. Watson was named athletic director at Loyola University Chicago on November 12, 2014, and brought on his very close friend Kate Achter to be the new head women's basketball coach in 2016.

See also
List of NCAA Division I athletic directors

References

External links
Loyola bio
St. Bonaventure bio

Living people
St. Bonaventure Bonnies athletic directors
Loyola Ramblers athletic directors
Rutgers Scarlet Knights men's basketball players
Bowling Green Falcons men's basketball players
Ohio University alumni
Year of birth missing (living people)